"Ivy Day in the Committee Room" is a short story by James Joyce published in his 1914 collection Dubliners. Taking place in a political party office after a day of canvassing, the story depicts various campaigners discussing the political candidates and issues of Irish nationalism and Home Rule. "Ivy Day" refers to an Irish holiday that commemorated Charles Stewart Parnell, an important Irish nationalist figure.

Plot summary
In a committee room, Mat O'Connor, a canvasser for Richard Tierney, a candidate in an upcoming municipal election, discusses child-rearing with Old Jack, who tries to keep a fire going. Joe Hynes, another canvasser, arrives and needles O’Connor on whether he’s been paid for his work yet. He proceeds to defend rival candidate Colgan's working-class background and maintains that Tierney, although a Nationalist, will likely present a welcome address at the upcoming visit of King Edward VII. When Hynes points out that it is Ivy Day, a commemoration of Charles Stewart Parnell, a nostalgic silence fills the room. Another canvasser, John Henchy, enters and derides Tierney for not having paid him yet. When Hynes leaves, Henchy voices a suspicion that the man is a spy for Colgan. Henchy badmouths another canvasser, Crofton, just before Crofton himself enters with Bantam Lyons. Crofton had worked for the Conservative candidate until the party withdrew and gave their support to Tierney.

The talk of politics drifts to Charles Stewart Parnell, who has his defenders and detractors in the room. Hynes returns and is encouraged to read his sentimental poem dedicated to Parnell.  The poem is highly critical of those who betrayed him, including the Catholic Church, and places Parnell among the ancient heroes of Ireland. All applaud the performance and seem to forget their differences for the moment.

Background

Joyce attributed the ideas for both "The Dead" and "Ivy Day" to Anatole France, although the latter story also owes something to his brother Stanislaus' account of their father at work during a Dublin by-election three years earlier.

After being rejected by Arthur Symons' publishers, Joyce sent Dubliners – then comprising only twelve stories – to publisher Grant Richards. It took nearly eight years for the book to be published. Going back and forth with Richards, who initially agreed to publish his work, Joyce revised and omitted many things in the book to reach an agreement. However, Richards objected to too many things and eventually simply refused to publish Dubliners at all.

Ireland has a prominent role in Joyce's writing. Having been under the rule of Great Britain since the sixteenth century, a longstanding division has always separated the two islands. Joyce found the city of Dublin especially interesting: “I do not think that any writer has yet presented Dublin to the world. It has been a capital of Europe for thousands of years, it is supposed to be the second city of the British Empire and is nearly three times as big as Venice.” 

In "Ivy Day in the Committee Room", Joyce touches on the deep-rooted political struggle by noting nationalist Charles Stewart Parnell and his role in Irish politics. His representation in "Ivy Day" is clear from the title of the story: Ivy Day is the anniversary of the death of Parnell, the "uncrowned king of Ireland". Parnell wanted to give the Irish people a greater role in the management of their own affairs.

Parnell's ousting from power served to delay Irish independence. In "Ivy Day in the Committee Room", the campaigners for Tierney are not campaigning for him to get into office, but rather as a way for them to earn money. They acknowledge, however, that “Some of those hillsiders and Fenians are a bit too clever if you ask me... Do you know what my private and candid opinion is about some of those little jokers? I believe half of them are in the pay of the Castle” (i.e. Protestant officials). “Fenian” was a nickname given to those conspiring in a revolutionary movement to free Ireland from Britain, a radical nationalist. The inactivity in “Ivy Day in the Committee Room” serves to show Joyce’s view of Irish nationalism. The stagnant conversations speak to Ireland’s paralytic nature. Nothing being accomplished in this story reflects the fact that nothing was being done about obtaining Ireland’s independence.

After Parnell's death, an Irish cultural and political movement was set into motion, through which citizens tried to figure out what it meant to live in Ireland with strong Irish roots. Ireland was split into segregated religious groups (Catholics versus Protestants), but most Irish were Catholic and wanted independence from Britain, as opposed to the mostly-Protestants conservatives, who were in favor of staying under British rule. The two pillars of this Irish nationalism were the Catholic faith and pride in Ireland's Gaelic cultural heritage, which lead to a renewed interest in the Irish language. As Scott Klein wrote in an article about Joyce: "The Celtic Revival attempted to produce a new Irish culture in the absence of compelling political cohesion after the death of Parnell."

References

Joyce, James. Dubliners (London: Grant Richards, 1914)

External links
 Dubliners at Project Gutenberg
 

Short stories by James Joyce
1914 short stories